= Hopeworks 'N Camden =

US nonprofit organization

Coordinates: 39°57′9.88″N 75°7′3.11″W

- Established: 2000; 26 years ago
- Purpose: Motivate at-risk youth
- Location(s): 543 State St., Camden, New Jersey, US
- Executive Director: Dan Rhoton
- Founding Director: Jeff Putthoff
- Board President: Charles S. McLister
- Budget: $1,000,000
- Staff: 47
- Volunteers: 20
- Website: hopeworks.org

Hopeworks 'N Camden is a nonprofit organization founded in 2000 in Camden, New Jersey, United States, to help young people in the city aged 14–25 to return to school and achieve employment. The program tutors and mentors high school students, as well as out-of-school youths, and offers courses in website development, geographic information system mapping and administration. Also, Hopeworks Youth Healing Team offers training and consultation to schools and nonprofits on working with traumatized youths and adults.

== History ==
The Hopeworks program was launched in 1999 by members of three churches in north Camden, one of the highest-crime areas in the United States. The original concept was to offer training to high school dropouts. With startup grants from the Campbell's and the Society of Jesus, Hopeworks began working with the first trainees in March 2000, and started its non-profit website design business.

In 2012, amidst a high drop-out rate in the program, Hopeworks became a certified Sanctuary organization with a "trauma" framework, which greatly improved the retention rate. Hopeworks has shared this lesson with others in Camden, bringing in national speakers for trauma summits. Representatives from at least a dozen groups meet regularly to discuss trauma-informed care, including the Camden County Police and the Camden Coalition of Healthcare Providers.

== Programs ==
The day training program provides technology training and job opportunities to out-of-school youths. It offers training in web design and GIS, along with literacy help and personal counseling (known as "formation") in which all the participating clients must participate. After three months, most participants have the skills to work for Hopeworks and to be admitted to entry-level college courses. They can continue working and training at Hopeworks as long as they are continuing their college education. At the conclusion of training, trainees are invited to join the Hopeworks Corporate Internship Program, which provides part-time, paid internships with local businesses and organizations.

== Awards ==
Hopework's tutoring program has assisted almost 3,000 Camden youths to earn high school diplomas, and 200 have gone on to college. In 2015 Hopeworks was named the Non-Profit of the Year by the Greater Philadelphia Chamber of Commerce.
